Nearly a King is a 1916 silent film romantic comedy directed by Frederick A. Thomson, produced by Famous Players Film Company and distributed by Paramount Pictures. John Barrymore stars in a story written for the screen. Barrymore's first wife Katherine Corri Harris makes her screen debut with him in this picture. Frederick Thomson directed and this is now a lost film.

One of the earliest screen appearances of a young Adolphe Menjou, just 25 years old.

Cast
John Barrymore - 1.Jack Merriwell, 2. The Prince of Bulwana, 3.himself-an out of work actor)
Katherine Corri Harris - The Princess
Russell Bassett - Regent of Okam
Beatrice Prentice - Marya
Martin Alsop - Grant Mason
Fred McGuirk - Olaf
Adolphe Menjou - Baron

See also
John Barrymore filmography

References

External links
Nearly a King at IMDb.com
Nearly a King; allmovie.com/ synopsis
lobby card production still(archived)

1916 films
American silent feature films
Lost American films
Films based on short fiction
1910s romantic comedy films
American romantic comedy films
American black-and-white films
1916 comedy films
Films directed by Frederick A. Thomson
1910s American films
Silent romantic comedy films
Silent American comedy films